Stink Creek is a stream in the U.S. states of North Dakota and South Dakota.

Stink Creek was named for the naturally occurring unpleasant odor originating at a bog at its source.

See also
List of rivers of North Dakota
List of rivers of South Dakota
Stinking Creek (disambiguation)

References

Rivers of Sioux County, North Dakota
Rivers of Corson County, South Dakota
Rivers of North Dakota
Rivers of South Dakota